Sebastian DeVicente is a trilingual actor (English, Spanish, Portuguese) mostly known for playing bad boys and off-beat characters. Some of his film credits include The City of Lost Souls (2000), a Japanese film directed by cinematic master Takashi Miike also starring Michelle Reis, Koji Kikkawa, and Terence Yin, and Dead in the Water (2002), a Lions Gate release directed by Gustavo Lipsztein also starring Dominique Swain, Henry Thomas, and Scott Bairstow.

In 2003, a nearly fatal motorcycle accident forced the young actor away from his career in Hollywood.

References

External links
 

Living people
American male actors
Year of birth missing (living people)
Place of birth missing (living people)